Paul Kwadwo Baffoe-Bonnie (born 26 December 1956) is a Ghanaian Supreme Court Judge.

Early life and education
Baffoe-Bonnie was born at Goase Mempeasem on 26 December 1956. His primary school education was at the Goaso Local Authority primary and middle schools, completing his Middle School Leaving Certificate examinations in the late 1960s. His secondary education was at the Konongo Odumase Secondary School where he obtained his GCE Ordinary Level and GCE Advanced Level certificates. He then attended the University of Ghana and later the Ghana Law School. Whilst in the law school he was room-mates with NPP politician, Kwadwo Owusu Afriyie and very good friends with current Chief Justice of Ghana, Kwasi Anin-Yeboah, he referred to the three of them forming ''a trio of village law students''.

Career
Baffoe-Bonnie was called to the Bar in Ghana in 1981. He worked as a Circuit Court Judge at Kumasi. He served as High Court Judge at Duayaw Nkwanta. He was appointed an Appeals Court judge in 2006. He was appointed a Supreme Court Judge by the President of Ghana John Kufuor in June 2008.

Election petition
In 2013, Baffoe-Bonnie was on the panel of Supreme Court Judges who ruled against a petition brought before it where the New Patriotic Party asked for about four million votes to be scrapped for alleged tampering in the 2012 Ghanaian general election.

Personal life
Baffoe-Bonnie's parents are Opanyin Baffoe-Bonnie from Sewua in the Bosomtwe district and Ama Kyerewaa from Breman in Kumasi. Baffoe-Bonnie has a wife called Pat. They have a daughter who qualified as a medical doctor in 2013. Her graduation ceremony reports were tainted by the fallout of the Election petition results earlier in 2013 HThe late, Kwasi Sainti Baffoe-Bonnie, who owned Network Broadcasting Company Limited which run Radio Gold FM in Ghana was his brother.

See also
List of judges of the Supreme Court of Ghana
Supreme Court of Ghana

References

Living people
Justices of the Supreme Court of Ghana
20th-century judges
21st-century judges
University of Ghana alumni
Konongo Odumase Senior High School alumni
1956 births